Allobates fratisenescus is a species of frog in the family Aromobatidae. It is endemic to Ecuador where it is known from the upper reaches of Pastaza River drainage, on the eastern side of the Cordillera Oriental.
Its natural habitats are tropical rainforest.

References

fratisenescus
Amphibians of Ecuador
Endemic fauna of Ecuador
Taxonomy articles created by Polbot
Amphibians described in 2000